The 70th Fighter Wing (70th FW) is an inactive United States Air Force unit. Its last assignment was with the United States Air Forces in Europe, based at Neubiberg Air Base, Germany. It was inactivated on 25 September 1947.

History
Established and organized at Paine Field, Washington in 1943 as a command and control organization.   Deployed to the European Theater of Operations (ETO) in late 1943 and assigned to IX Fighter Command, Ninth Air Force.  Initial Mission of the Wing was to receive operational orders from Headquarters, IX Fighter Command and direct subordinate groups in attacking enemy targets in Occupied France and the Low Countries in preparation for the Normandy Invasion in June 1944.    Targets included bridges, roads, railroads and enemy interceptor aircraft both on the ground as well as in air-to-air combat.

After the D-Day invasion, was reassigned to IX Tactical Air Command (IX TAC) and directed to provide ground support for advancing United States First Army forces in France, attacking enemy targets initially in the Cotentin Peninsula, then supported Operation Cobra, the breakout of Normandy and attacked enemy forces in the Falaise-Argentan Gap. Wing headquarters and subordinate units operated primarily from liberated airfields and newly built temporary Advanced Landing Grounds in France, moved into north-central France, its groups attacking enemy targets near Paris then north-west into Belgium and the southern Netherlands.   In December 1944/January 1945, engaged enemy targets on the north side of the Battle of the Bulge, then moved eastward into the Northern Rhineland as part of the Western Allied invasion of Germany.

Supported First Army as it crossed the Rhine River at Remagen then moved north to attack ground targets in the Ruhr, providing air support as Allied ground forces encircled enemy forces in the Ruhr Pocket, essentially ending organized enemy resistance in Western Germany.   First Army halted its advance at the Elbe River in late April 1945, the wing engaging targets of opportunity in enemy-controlled areas until combat was ended on 5 May 1945.

Remained in Europe after the war as part of United States Air Forces in Europe, performing occupation duty and the destruction or shipment to the United States of captured enemy combat equipment. Assigned units also performed air defense duty over the American Zone of Occupation.  Inactivated in Germany on 25 September 1947.

Operations and decorations
 Combat Operations:  Combat in European Theater of Operations (ETO), 29 November 1943-May 1945.
 Campaigns: Air Offensive, Europe; Normandy; Northern France; Rhineland; Ardennes-Alsace; Central Europe
 Decorations: Cited in the Order of the Day, Belgian Army: 6 Jun – 30 Sep 1944; 16 Dec 1944 – 25 Jan 1945. Belgian Fourragere.

Lineage
 Constituted as 70th Fighter Wing on 11 August 1943
 Activated on 15 August 1943
 Inactivated on 25 September 1947

Assignments
 IX Fighter Command, 29 November 1943 – 3 October 1944
 IX Tactical Air Command, 3 October 1944 – 2 December 1945
 United States Air Forces in Europe
 XII Tactical Air Command, 2 December 1945 – 25 September 1947

Units assigned

 354th Fighter Group: (P-51 Mustang), 2 December 1943 – 15 April 1944
 358th Fighter Group: (P-47 Thunderbolt), 1 October 1944 – 16 January 1945
 Attached to: IX Tactical Air Command, entire period
 362d Fighter Group: (P-38 Lightning), 13 April – 1 August 1944
 Attached to: IX Air Support Command, entire period
 363d Fighter Group: (P-38 Lightning), 23 December 1943 – 1 August 1944
 Attached to: IX Air Support Command, entire period
 365th Fighter Group: (P-47 Thunderbolt), 22 December 1943 – 1 August 1944
 Attached to: IX Air Support Command, entire period

 367th Fighter Group: (P-38 Lightning), 6 July 1944 – 16 January 1945
 Attached to: IX Air Support (later, IX Tactical Air) Command, 3 October 1944 – 16 January 1945
 368th Fighter Group: (P-47 Thunderbolt), 1 October 1944 – 16 January 1945
 Attached to: IX Tactical Air Command, entire period
 370th Fighter Group: (P-47 Thunderbolt), 1 October 1944 – 1 February 1945
 Attached to: IX Tactical Air Command, entire period
 474th Fighter Group: (P-38 Lightning), 1 August 1944 – 6 December 1945
 Attached to: IX Tactical Air Command, 1 August 1944 – 21 November 1945

Bases assigned

 Paine Field, Washington, 15 August – 8 November 1943
 RAF Greenham Common (USAAF Station 486), England, 29 November 1943
 RAF Boxted (AAF-150), England, 6 December 1943
 RAF Ibsley (AAF-347), England, 17 April – June 1944
 Cricqueville-en-Bessin Airfield (A-2), France, 9 June 1944
 Villedieu-les-Poêles, France, 4 August 1944
 Le Teilleul, France, 16 August 1944
 Aillières-Beauvoir, France, 22 August 1944

 Versailles, France, 31 August 1944
 Marchais-en-Brie, France, 10 September 1944
 Liège Airfield, Belgium (A-93), 3 October 1944
 Verviers, Belgium, 22 January 1945
 Brühl, Germany, 18 March 1945
 Bad Wildungen, Germany, 30 May 1945
 Fürstenfeldbruck Air Base, Germany, 28 July 1945
 Neubiberg Airdrome, Germany, 10 November 1945 – 25 September 1947

References

 Maurer, Maurer (1983). Air Force Combat Units of World War II. Maxwell AFB, Alabama: Office of Air Force History. .
 Johnson, David C. (1988), U.S. Army Air Forces Continental Airfields (ETO), D-Day to V-E Day; Research Division, USAF Historical Research Center, Maxwell AFB, Alabama.

External links

Military units and formations established in 1943
070